Ostrovsky, Ostrovskoy, Ostrovskii (masculine), Ostrovskaya, Ostrovska (feminine), or Ostrovskoye (neuter) may refer to:

Places
Ostrovsky District, several districts in Russia
Ostrovsky (inhabited locality), several rural localities in Russia
Ostrovsky Square, see Fences in Saint Petersburg

People
Ostrovsky (surname), several people

See also
House of Ostrovsky, former name of Maly Theatre, Moscow
Ostrovsky Institute (disambiguation)
Ostrowski (disambiguation)